Svetlana is a Slavic female given name.

Svetlana may also refer to:

 Russian ship Svetlana, three Imperial Russian Navy ships
 Svetlana-class cruiser, the only light cruiser class of the Imperial Russian Navy
 Svetlana (TV series), a HDNet comedy series that premiered in 2010
 Svetlana (ballad), an 1813 ballad by Vasily Zhukovsky
 Svetlana (company), a company based in Saint Petersburg, Russia

See also
 Svetlina (disambiguation)